John Brookes may refer to:

John Brookes (East India Company), 17th century commander of first British vessel to come within sight of the Australian continent
Sir John Brookes, 1st Baronet (died 1691), English MP
John Henry Brookes (1891–1975), last principal of Oxford City Technical School
John Brookes (footballer, born 1927) (1927–2018), English football midfielder
John Brookes (footballer, born 1945), English football forward
John Brookes (landscape designer) (1933–2018), British garden and landscape designer

See also
John Brooks (disambiguation)
John Brooke (disambiguation)
Jon Brooks (disambiguation)